The Second Wife or The Second Mrs. Tanqueray (Italian:La seconda moglie) is a 1922 Italian silent drama film directed by Amleto Palermi and starring Pina Menichelli, Elena Lunda and Alfredo Martinelli. It is an adaptation of Arthur Wing Pinero's 1893 British play The Second Mrs Tanqueray, about a woman who struggles to overcome rumours about her past.

Cast
 Alfredo Bertone   
 Orietta Claudi  
 Elena Lunda   
 Alfredo Martinelli  
 Alfredo Menichelli  
 Pina Menichelli   
 Livio Pavanelli

References

Bibliography
 Angela Dalle Vacche. Diva: Defiance and Passion in Early Italian Cinema. University of Texas Press, 2008.

External links 
 

1922 films
1922 drama films
Italian drama films
Italian silent feature films
1920s Italian-language films
Films directed by Amleto Palermi
Italian films based on plays
Italian black-and-white films
Silent drama films
1920s Italian films